Kyle Keller (born January 25, 2005) is an American professional stock car racing driver. He competes full-time in the ARCA Menards Series West, driving the No. 12 Chevrolet SS for his family-owned team, Kyle Keller Racing, and part-time in the ARCA Menards Series, driving the No. 12 Chevrolet SS for Kyle Keller Racing. He previously drove for Jerry Pitts Racing in the 2020 ARCA Menards Series West.

Racing career

Lucas Oil Modified Series 
Keller would drive a full time season in the Lucas Oil Modified Series in 2019, for his family owned team. Keller had six top tens, which placed him fourth in the overall standings. He would also compete in the SRL 5th Annual Winter Showdown at Kern County Raceway Park that year, and would finish in thirteenth.

ARCA Menards Series West 
Keller would sign with Jerry Pitts Racing for two races in the 2020 ARCA Menards Series West. He would get one top-five and two top tens in his only two starts, finishing sixteenth in the final standings. He made one start for Jerry Pitts Racing in 2021, finishing fifth at his home track, the Las Vegas Motor Speedway Bullring. On January 3, 2022, Keller announced that he will be running the full 2022 ARCA Menards Series West schedule for his own team, Kyle Keller Racing.

SRL Southwest Tour 
Keller made two starts in the SRL Southwest Tour in 2021, driving in the first and last race of the season. He finished eighteenth at the Irwindale Event Center, and fourth at the Kern County Raceway Park. He would get his first ever late model win at the Madera Speedway Short Track Shootout, after starting from the pole and leading the most laps.

NASCAR Advance Auto Parts Weekly Series 
He ran two races in the NASCAR Advance Auto Parts Weekly Series in 2021, driving at the Las Vegas Motor Speedway Bullring. He would get one top-five and two top tens, finishing eighteenth in the regular standings.

Motorsports career results

ARCA Menards Series
(key) (Bold – Pole position awarded by qualifying time. Italics – Pole position earned by points standings or practice time. * – Most laps led.)

ARCA Menards Series West 
(key) (Bold – Pole position awarded by qualifying time. Italics – Pole position earned by points standings or practice time. * – Most laps led.)

References

External links 
 

Living people
2005 births
ARCA Menards Series drivers
NASCAR drivers
Racing drivers from Las Vegas
Racing drivers from Nevada
Sportspeople from Las Vegas